Per Andris Bjørang (born 31 January 1948) is a former Norwegian speed skater and Sprint World Champion. At the 1972 Winter Olympics in Sapporo he finished 4th in the 500 metres. He became World Champion in sprint in 1974.

His highest placement on the "Sprint Adelskalender" was number five, in 1976. He was born in Lillehammer and represented the club Oslo IL.

References

External links
 
 

1948 births
Living people
Norwegian male speed skaters
Speed skaters at the 1972 Winter Olympics
Olympic speed skaters of Norway
Universiade medalists in speed skating
Universiade bronze medalists for Norway
Competitors at the 1972 Winter Universiade
Sportspeople from Lillehammer
20th-century Norwegian people